Orehoved Lighthouse is a lighthouse in Orehoved on the north coast of Falster, Denmark. It was built in 1895 on the northwest corner of the quay, replacing an earlier light which had simply been placed on a mast at the end of the railway pier. A blue gas burner was installed in 1912.

See also

 List of lighthouses and lightvessels in Denmark

References

External links
Picture of Orehoved Lighthouse

Lighthouses completed in 1895
Buildings and structures in Falster
Listed lighthouses in Denmark
Listed buildings and structures in Guldborgsund Municipality